Aarhus Docklands (Danish: Aarhus Ø) is a new neighbourhood and construction site in Aarhus, Denmark.

Construction of Aarhus Docklands began in 2008 and most buildings and constructions have been finished as of 2018. The project will convert the former container port, Nordhavn in the Port of Aarhus, to a new residential, educational, commercial and recreational area, consisting of high rise buildings of modern architectural designs, seaside promenades and a network of canals.

Fully developed, the Docklands neighbourhood is intended to sustain 10-12,000 residents and 10,000 jobs in an area equalling the size of Trøjborg, an adjacent neighbourhood. Aarhus Docklands offers a view of the Aarhus Bay and there is just a short distance to the inner city.

Aarhus Docklands is part of the larger Peri-urban Harbour-areas (De Bynære Havnearealer) comprising nearly all of the old harbour district along the coastline. It is among the largest harbourfront development projects in Europe.

Projects 
The projects at Aarhus Docklands includes several notable architectural designs:

 Isbjerget (The Iceberg), by JDS Architects and CEBRA won the 2013 MIPIM property development Awards.
 Z house, by Bjarke Ingels Group.
 Grundfos Kollegiet, a dormitory financed by the Danish company of Grundfos.
 Navitas Park, a research centre of energy technology. Part of INCUBA Science Park, with education, engineering, innovation and entrepreneurship. Finished.

Light House (Aarhus)

The Lighthouse (or Lighthouse*), is a residential project under construction in Aarhus Docklands, the new harbour front district of Aarhus. The project was originally divided in 2 phases, but due to financial problems, the first phase was sub-divided in 2 stages. Both these initial stages are completed, with stage 2 finished in 2014.

Despite what its name might suggest, Light House is not actually a functioning lighthouse, since such was not needed at the time of construction.

Construction and change of plans
The original phase 2 of the Light House project, included a 142 m tall tower. Located at the edge of the harbour front, overlooking the Aarhus Bay, it would have been the tallest building in Denmark and a landmark for the city of Aarhus. It was supposed to comprise more apartments, offices, a hotel and restaurant and underground parking lots. In addition to the original financial problems, it was discovered during the construction of phase 1 in 2008, that the construction ground was not stable enough to support a tower of that size. A countrywide geological survey showed that the building site was in fact one of the most unstable in Denmark. In December 2013, the investment company of Havneinvest A/S decided not to use the buy- and construct-option for the tower site. The option prize was DKK 270 mill (originally DKK 417 million), but after four years of thorough investigations for DKK 9 million, the investor concluded that the project could not be realized. The investigations revealed among several issues, that the wind conditions could not allow for balconies at the tower. The Hilton Hotels & Resorts company has also abandoned the project, because they found the hotel capacity in Aarhus large enough for the market.

The construction price for the tower has been estimated at DKK 1.5 billion and now Aarhus Municipality is considering other investors and a rethinking of the original tower project altogether.

Return of the tower
On the 13th of March 2018, a modified version of the tower was publicly reinstated into the Lighthouse plan. The 45 storey, 142 meter tall building is expected to be finished in 2022.

Gallery

References

Sources 
 The Aarhus Docklands The Development Secretariat for the Aarhus Docklands 
 Aarhus kommune
 De Bynære Havnearealer, Center for Byudvikling og Mobilitet (17 September 2014): Lighthouse*: Ikonbyggeri på kanten af Aarhus, Aarhus Kommune.

External links

Port of Aarhus
Redeveloped ports and waterfronts in Denmark
De Bynære Havnearealer
Neighborhoods of Aarhus
Aarhus C